The Victory Tower, also referred to as Mandarin Oriental Dallas Hotel & Residences, is a canceled skyscraper in the Victory Park neighborhood of Dallas, Texas. At the time its proposal, the building would have been the tallest structure under construction in the city, and was the only building planned to rise over  up for proposal in Dallas.

History
The Victory Tower's official groundbreaking took place in late 2006, with construction underway by early 2007. The tower, designed by the New York City-based Kohn Pedersen Fox architectural firm, was originally proposed as the centerpiece building project of the new Victory Park development in Dallas, along with one other skyscraper. The other tower, One Victory Tower, was planned to rise  and 40 floors on the lot adjacent to the Victory Tower. However, the project was not approved by the city, and was subsequently canceled. According to an unnamed source at Hillwood Development, the Victory Tower project has been placed "on hold until 2011" as of March 13, 2008. The construction crane has been dismantled and removed. The construction fence has been whitewashed, covering all evidence of the Mandarin Oriental Hotel and Tower project.

Height
Upon completion, the Victory Tower would have risen , surpassing the Thanksgiving Tower to become the 8th-tallest structure in the city. The building was planned to consist of a Mandarin Oriental hotel and commercial offices on its lower floors, with only the upper floors serving as residential condominiums, so it would not have been the tallest all-residential building in the city, a record held by Republic Center Tower I. It would, however, have broken the record for the highest residence in the city, surpassing both Republic Center Tower I and the proposed Museum Tower. Furthermore, upon completion, the Victory Tower would have been the tallest building in the new Victory Park neighborhood of Dallas, surpassing the  W Dallas Victory Hotel and Residences.

Features
The Victory Tower would have been one of the tallest mixed-use buildings in Texas upon completion, housing a Mandarin Oriental hotel, residential condominiums, office space, commercial retail levels, six restaurants, and a spa. Mandarin Oriental would have been the primary tenant of the building, occupying the lowest eleven stories of the tower with a 120-room hotel and the building's upper 21 floors with 91 Mandarin Oriental-branded residences. The hotel staterooms would have been among the largest in the city, averaging  each.
On the lower levels, the tower would have also contained  of commercial office space and a luxury  retail mall.

See also

 List of tallest buildings in Dallas
 List of tallest buildings in Texas
 List of tallest buildings in the United States

References

External links
 Mandarin Oriental Dallas & Residences on Emporis
 Victory Tower on SkyscraperPage

Skyscrapers in Dallas
Condo hotels in the United States
Mandarin Oriental Hotel Group
Unbuilt buildings and structures in the United States